Inside Llewyn Davis is the soundtrack of music from the 2013 American film of the same name, written, directed and produced by the Coen brothers and starring Oscar Isaac, Carey Mulligan, John Goodman, Garrett Hedlund and Justin Timberlake.

With the film set in New York City during the 1960s, the soundtrack, produced by T Bone Burnett, uses folk music appropriate to the time period. With the exception of Bob Dylan's "Farewell" and Dave Van Ronk's "Green, Green Rocky Road", the rest of the tracks are modern recordings.

Reception

Track listing

Personnel

Charts
{| class="wikitable sortable plainrowheaders"
|-
! scope="col" style="width:19em;"| Chart (2013)
! scope="col"| Peakposition
|-
! scope="row"| French Albums (SNEP)
| align="center"| 84
|-
! scope="row" 
|-
! scope="row" 
|-
! scope="row"| Swiss Charts (Hitparade)
| align="center"| 61
|-
! scope="row"| US Billboard 200
| align="center"| 14
|-
! scope="row"| US Folk Albums (Billboard)
| align="center"| 1
|-
! scope="row"| US Rock Albums (Billboard)
| align="center"| 13
|-
! scope="row"| US Soundtrack Albums (Billboard)
| align="center"| 3
|}

Year-end charts

Release history

See also
 Inside Llewyn Davis''
 O Brother, Where Art Thou? (soundtrack)

References

External links
 

2013 soundtrack albums
Folk soundtracks
Comedy-drama film soundtracks
Albums produced by T Bone Burnett
Albums produced by Marcus Mumford
Warner Music Group soundtracks